The 2009 Bradfield by-election was held for the Australian House of Representatives seat of Bradfield on 5 December 2009. This was triggered as a result of the resignation of former minister and ex-Liberal Party leader Brendan Nelson. The by-election was held on the same day as the Higgins by-election.

The by-election was contested on the same boundaries drawn for Bradfield at the 2007 federal election. At that election, the Liberal Party won the seat over the Labor Party with a 63.45 per cent of the vote on a two-party-preferred basis, making it the safest metropolitan seat in Australia for the Liberals. At the time, the 2007 result was the second-closest in the seat's 60-year history (after the 1952 Bradfield by-election against an independent). The Liberal candidate had never needed to go to preferences to win the seat.

The writ for the by-election was issued on 30 October, with the rolls closing on 9 November. Candidate nominations closed on 12 November, and were announced the following day. At 22 candidates, it ties with the 1992 Wills by-election for the most candidates to contest a federal lower house seat.

Both the Bradfield and Higgins by-elections were the last by-elections for the House of Representatives until the Griffith by-election held in February 2014.

Background
At the 2007 federal election, the opposition Kevin Rudd-led Labor Party defeated the incumbent John Howard-led Liberal-National coalition government. This marked the first change of government in over 11 years. Brendan Nelson had served in ministerial positions in the Howard government, before taking over the Liberal leadership from Howard after the election loss. He lost the leadership to Malcolm Turnbull less than a year later after sustained poor polling.

Nelson first won the seat of Bradfield at the 1996 election.

Nelson had initially indicated (16 February 2009) he would stay as the member until the next election, at which time he would retire from parliament.  On 25 August 2009, however, he announced he would be resigning by late September, thus triggering a by-election. On 16 September 2009, he was appointed as Ambassador to the European Union, NATO, Belgium and Luxembourg. He officially resigned from the House on 19 October 2009.

Campaign
The Higgins and Bradfield by-election campaigns were overshadowed by Liberal infighting over Labor's Carbon Pollution Reduction Scheme, culminating in the replacement of Malcolm Turnbull with Tony Abbott as Liberal leader. Although fairly safe on paper, some commentators including Malcolm Mackerras tipped the Greens to win in Higgins, and force the Liberals to preferences in Bradfield.

Candidates
The following table is the order and party affiliation of each candidate who has nominated to contest the seat of Bradfield on 5 December 2009.

The Australian Labor Party did not stand a candidate. The Christian Democrats suggested that they were considering running up to eleven candidates (eleven being the number of faithful disciples). The CDP ended up fielding nine candidates.

Results
The Liberal Party retained the seat.

§ The combined Christian Democrats vote was 3.58 percent, an increase of 1.84 percentage points.

Aftermath

The Christian Democratic Party's lead candidate, James Whitehall, resigned from the party soon after the by-election on strong disagreement with the content of a controversial and unauthorised survey circulated by the campaign director Michael Darby. The platform of the CDP for the by-election was focused on the controversial Emissions Trading Scheme, which was supported by both the Liberal and Labor parties at the time of the by-election. Changes to the CDP platform, as suggested by the controversial survey, had not been sighted or approved by many of its candidates. Whitehall's father, the party's junior deputy president, also resigned. Being the author of the survey, which included questions on whether the Government should be able to deport Muslims, and whether mosques and Islamic schools should be banned, Darby faced expulsion from the party. He was ultimately relieved of his position, and party leader, Fred Nile, offered an apology for the survey, also stating that the CDP would not run multiple candidates in any electorates in future.

See also
 List of Australian federal by-elections
 1952 Bradfield by-election

References

External links
 Bradfield by-election: Antony Green ABC
 Bradfield by-election: The Poll Bludger

2009 elections in Australia
New South Wales federal by-elections